Tappe Bardnakoon is an archaeological site in Farsan County, Chaharmahal and Bakhtiari province, Iran. It is situated  kilometers southeast of the village of Deh Cheshmeh, near the southern shore of the Pireghar River. It is mainly a Sasanian site, although some pottery from the Parthian, Achaemenid, Elamite and Chalcolithic periods were also found in a few spots. During the late Sasanian era, the site nowadays known as Tappe Bardnakoon was part of the canton of Rāwar-kust-ī-rōdbār and was an administrative centre of the province of Gay. It provided for interactions between different provinces of Eranshahr, in particular Gay in Spahan, Ram-Ohrmazd, Ormazd-Ardashir and Weh-Andiyok-Shapur in Khuzistan, and Ig in Pars.

The site was illegally excavated and looted in the past, and thus only a minor part of the site remains undamaged. Professional, government-approved excavations in 2017 and 2018 led to the excavation of many Sasanian-era items, including 559 clay bullae, amongst them administrative bullae.

References

Sources
 

Archaeological sites in Iran
Sasanian Empire
Former populated places in Iran
Farsan County
Buildings and structures in Chaharmahal and Bakhtiari Province